Malcolm Howard may refer to:
Malcolm Jones Howard (born 1939), United States federal judge
Malcolm Howard (rower) (born 1983), Canadian rower